Where the Giant Sleeps is a 2007 children's picture book by Mem Fox and illustrated by Vladimir Radunsky. A bedtime book, it was published by Harcourt, Inc., and it is about a giant and the creatures that inhabit it sleeping and preparing for sleep as seen through a telescope by a child who, as it turns out, is dreaming.

Reception
A brief review of Where the Giant Sleeps in The New York Times wrote: "A dreamlike landscape - houses, trees, hills and pastures - makes the form of a sleeping giant. Small readers will enjoy putting the details together, and Radunsky's gouache illustrations seem to glow with starlight". Kirkus Reviews wrote: "Casting dim moonlight over drowsy forms made with cloudy edges and soft colors, the artist expertly captures the poem’s tone and makes the slide down into dreamland well-nigh inevitable".

Where the Giant Sleeps has also been reviewed by the following publications: Publishers Weekly, Booklist, School Library Journal, Horn Book Guides, Library Media Connection, Magpies, and The Center for Children’s Literature.

References

External links
 Library holdings of Where the Giant Sleeps

Australian picture books
2007 children's books
Picture books by Mem Fox
Fiction about giants
Sleep in fiction